Sandusky is a hamlet in the town of Freedom in Cattaraugus County, New York, United States. Sandusky had a post office from December 23, 1830, until June 8, 1996; it still has its own ZIP code, 14133.

References

Hamlets in Cattaraugus County, New York
Hamlets in New York (state)